Santana (Portuguese for Saint Anne) is a town on the eastern coast of São Tomé Island, which is part of the island nation of São Tomé and Príncipe. It is the seat of Cantagalo District. The population of Santana with the adjacent settlements Cidade Alta, Cova Água, Gomes, Nova Olinda, Picão Flor, Praia Messias Alves, Riboque Santana and Zandrigo is 10,290 (2012). Santana lies 9 km south of the capital São Tomé and 17 km northeast of São João dos Angolares. The islet Ilhéu de Santana lies about 1 km off-shore, 2.5 km southeast of Santana.

Population history

Sister city
Cascais, Portugal

Persons
Alda Bandeira, a São Tomean politician
Conceição Lima, poet

Sports
6 de Setembro - football (soccer) club
Santana FC

References

Populated places in Cantagalo District
Populated coastal places in São Tomé and Príncipe